Rick Girard (born May 1, 1974) is a Canadian former professional ice hockey player. 

Girard was selected by the Vancouver Canucks in the 2nd round (46th overall) of the 1993 NHL Entry Draft but never played in the NHL. He spent the majority of his career in the Deutsche Eishockey Liga in Germany, playing for the Kaufbeurer Adler, Augsburger Panther, SERC Wild Wings, München Barons, Frankfurt Lions, Adler Mannheim and ERC Ingolstadt.

Career statistics

Awards
 WHL East First All-Star Team – 1993 & 1994

References

External links

1974 births
Living people
Adler Mannheim players
Augsburger Panther players
Canadian ice hockey forwards
Cleveland Lumberjacks players
Frankfurt Lions players
Hamilton Canucks players
ERC Ingolstadt players
Kaufbeurer Adler players
Manitoba Moose (IHL) players
München Barons players
Quebec Rafales players
Schwenninger Wild Wings players
Ice hockey people from Edmonton
Swift Current Broncos players
Syracuse Crunch players
Vancouver Canucks draft picks
Canadian expatriate ice hockey players in Germany